William Henry Miller Jr. (January 1, 1954 – November 13, 2016) was an American musician, archivist, and rock 'n' roll collector whose magazine, Kicks, and record label, Norton (both co-founded with his wife Miriam Linna), championed vintage rockabilly and garage bands. 

Miller was born in Jamaica, Queens, and raised in Carle Place, on Long Island. He attended Carle Place High School, earned a bachelor's degree in photography and art from the C.W. Post campus of Long Island University, and worked as a draftsman at the same firm as his father, Gibbs & Cox. He and Linna met in 1977; they established Kicks in 1979, and Norton Records in 1986. He performed with the Zantees and the A-Bones, produced records for Hasil Adkins, Roky Erickson and Flat Duo Jets, and wrote liner notes for reissues by the Fabulous Wailers, Astronauts, Trashmen and others.

Miller died in 2016, from complications of multiple myeloma, kidney failure and diabetes.

References

1954 births
2016 deaths
Deaths from multiple myeloma
American rock musicians
American writers about music
Record collectors
Carle Place High School alumni
LIU Post alumni